Alejandro Carrizo (born 12 May 1974) is a Venezuelan swimmer. He competed in the men's 4 × 100 metre freestyle relay event at the 1996 Summer Olympics.

References

External links
 

1974 births
Living people
Venezuelan male swimmers
Olympic swimmers of Venezuela
Swimmers at the 1996 Summer Olympics
Place of birth missing (living people)
Pan American Games medalists in swimming
Pan American Games bronze medalists for Venezuela
Swimmers at the 1995 Pan American Games
Medalists at the 1995 Pan American Games
20th-century Venezuelan people
21st-century Venezuelan people